William Fitzherbert may refer to: 

Saint William of York, Archbishop of York
William Fitzherbert (New Zealand politician) (1810–1891), New Zealand politician
Sir William FitzHerbert, 1st Baronet (1748–1791),  of Derbyshire
William Fitzherbert (MP), British MP for Derby 1762–1772
William Fitzherbert (c. 1520–1559?), MP for Lichfield
William Fitzherbert (mayor) (1842–1906), mayor of Lower Hutt, New Zealand